The tram network of Budapest is part of the mass transit system of Budapest, the capital city of Hungary. The tram lines serve as the second most important backbone of the transit system (after the bus network), carrying almost 100 million more passengers annually than the Budapest Metro.

, it was composed of 38 lines (26 main lines, and 11 supplemental lines denoted by an ’A’ , ’B’ or ’G’ after the route number), and the Budapest Cog-wheel Railway. The system is operated by Budapesti Közlekedési Zrt. (’Budapest Transit LLC.’) under the supervision of the municipal Budapesti Közlekedési Központ (’Budapest Transit Center’).

Since 2016 Budapest tram system use the world's longest 9-sectioned articulated tram vehicle CAF Urbos 3/9.

History

The early days
The first horse-tram line in Budapest was inaugurated on 30 July 1866 between Újpest-Városkapu and Kálvin tér, through Váci út. Over a year before, on 22 May 1865, the Count Sándor Károlyi founded the PKVT (Pesti Közúti Vaspálya Társaság). Horse tramlines in Buda proper soon followed, built by the competing Buda Public Road Rail Tracks Company (BKVT).

By 1885, Budapest had as many as 15 horsecar lines but since it was obvious that the technology was obsolete. A steam-driven suburban railway line from Közvágóhíd (Slaughterhouse) to Soroksár, run by HÉV, was separately introduced in 1887; two more lines soon followed.

 
Around this same time, Mór Balázs suggested that a new, electric tram system should be introduced to Budapest. It was Gábor Baross, then secretary of state at the Ministry of Community Service and Transportation who authorised the construction of the first test tram line between Nyugati railway station and Király utca. Balázs teamed up with Siemens & Halske and Lindheim és Társa and formed a new corporation: BVV (Budapesti Városi Vasút). The construction works (carried out by Siemens & Halske) started on October 1, 1887 and the line was opened on November 28, 1887.
 
The second step in the expansion of the system were two  lines: on July 20, 1889 the second line, which spanned from Egyetem tér to Fiumei út via Kálvin tér, was opened. It was designed so that in case of a power failure steam engines could tow the carriages. The third line, also standard gauge, was opened on September 10, 1889 and ran from the Hungarian Academy of Sciences to Andrássy út.

Even though not a tram line per se, the first underground line in Continental Europe, the Millennium Underground Railway must also be noted. It was built using a cut-and-cover method between 1894 and 1896 and was first named FJFVV (Ferenc József Földalatti Villamos Vasút) after emperor Franz Joseph. It used electric cars from the very beginning.

In the first years, tram had no numbers but coloured circular signals instead, for example, a simple red, green, blue or black disk; a red disk with a vertical white stripe or a cross; a white disk with a green 8-pointed green star, etc. This, of course, quickly became very cumbersome so around 1900, when there were already 30 lines, each line got a number – BVV, which was renamed to BVVV (Budapesti Villamos Városi Vasút) got the even numbers; odd numbers were assigned to a rival transport company, BKVT (Budapesti Közúti Vaspálya Társaság).

In the last year of the First World War, there were already 1,072 tram trains running in Budapest or on the outskirts of the capital. This fleet carried more than 382 million passengers in Budapest in 1918.

The dynamically growing network brought new companies: two of them served Újpest, the northern part of Pest, one Pestszentlőrinc, which then was a separate town, and one the southern part of Buda and the then-separate village Budafok. These companies were joined together in 1923 by the name BSZKRT (Budapest Székesfővárosi Közlekedési Rt.). It was during 1939-1944 that the most tram lines (66) existed in the city.

After World War II

The siege of Budapest left the city with a crippled infrastructure: many houses were destroyed, as well as the bridges bombed, electric cables torn. It was of course of utmost importance to restore the transport network, however, many trams were destroyed either in the siege or in a depot fire that occurred in 1947. This might have been the cause that decisionmakers suggested that trolleybus lines should replace trams in the city centre. Along with cost considerations it is important to note that trolleybuses might be better suited for the downtown area than trams: they turn more easily and produce significantly less noise.

While some tram lines were abolished in favour of trolleybuses, the expansion of the system did not stop. Near Nyugati railway station a new junction of tram lines were built to transport people back and forth to the factories in Angyalföld and Újpest and line 33 through the newly built Árpád Bridge. Line 4 on the Buda side and the tracks on Nagy Lajos király útja were also extended around 1960. The reconstruction of Erzsébet Bridge in 1964 played a significant role in the revival of the tram network: five lines started using it after its opening.

In 1968 there were 83 tram lines in Budapest (10 of which night services) thus reaching the largest extent of the network since World War II, decline was imminent. This happened partly because of the replacement of tram lines with single track and old vehicles with autobuses but also due to the construction of underground lines M2 and M3 which – were then thought to – replace tram lines that used to run above them. In 1972 tram lines on Erzsébet Bridge and Rákóczi út were abolished, then until 1982 tram lines were removed along M3 as well thereby effectively erasing 40 km of rail tracks, around 20% of the Budapest tram network. Along with lines in the city centre, most of the lines in Újpest and some in the southern parts of Pest were demolished.

While many lines were closed down, a significant one was rising: tram 33 was shut down for the renovation of Árpád Bridge in 1981 but when the bridge was reopened, a new line was born on the eastern end of the outer ring road, Hungária körgyűrű, line 1. It has been under construction ever since with segments opened in 1984, 1987, 1990, 1993, 1995, 2000, 2015 and 2019. In 2015 the line crossed to the Buda side of Rákóczi Bridge which was inaugurated in 1995 and was designed for the tram to cross it.

Present and future
As of 2012, it seems that the local governments have shifted towards a more tram-friendly view: line 1 and 3 were renovated  and line 1 extended (mostly from EU funding); line 47 and 49 are planned to reach Nyugati tér once again as it used to be their final stop before M3 was opened. A major project was carried out to connect, extend, and develop the tram lines on the Buda side (providing longer lines and fewer transfers).

Lines and developments
, it was composed of 38 lines (26 main lines, and 11 supplemental lines denoted by an ’A’ or ’G’ after the route number), and the Budapest Cog-wheel Railway. Among these lines, only Line 6 offers non-stop service, most of the trams run between 5 am and 11 pm.

Discontinued lines
It is not always straightforward to decide whether a tram line still exists in Budapest since throughout the decades some numbers may have been carried by several lines (not at the same time though), so some numbers might have appeared and disappeared throughout time. Some lines were assigned new numbers so even though there is no line with that specific number, there is a line on exactly the same route. Of course, existing lines might have been lengthened or shortened, so this also makes hard to exactly define a tram line. Still, the following table tries to summarize these data – termini and dates refer to the last time the number was used.

Rolling stock

Current fleet
As of 24 June 2021

Depots

See also

BKV Zrt.
Budapest Castle Hill Funicular
Budapest Cog-wheel Railway
Budapest Metro
List of town tramway systems in Hungary

References

External links

 Budapesti Közlekedési Vállalat (BKV) - official site 
 Budapesti Közlekedési Vállalat (BKV) - official site 
 Budapest network map (including tram lines) (pdf)
 The GS Tram site - Budapest
 Villamosok.hu 
 Trams of Hungary

Budapest
Public transport in Budapest
Tourist attractions in Budapest
Metre gauge railways in Hungary
Budapest